USS Michigan was the United States Navy's first iron-hulled warship and served during the American Civil War. She was renamed USS Wolverine in 1905.

Construction and design
The side wheel steamer Michigan was built in response to the British Government arming two steamers in response to the Canadian rebellions in the late 1830s with Secretary of the Navy Abel P. Upshur selecting an iron hull partly as a test of practicability of using such a "cheap and indestructible a material" for ships. The ship was designed by Samuel Hartt, and fabricated in parts at Pittsburgh in the last half of 1842, transported overland and assembled at Erie. The launch on 5 December 1843 was unsuccessful with the ship sticking after moving some  down the ways and efforts to complete the launch ended by nightfall. On returning in the morning Hartt found Michigan had "launched herself in the night" and was floating offshore in Lake Erie.

By 1908 the ship was noted in the journal The American Marine Engineer as being the oldest metal-hulled vessel then existing and of interest to engineers because of the ship's age. The first of three sets of boilers were return flue type that lasted fifty years before finally being replaced by bricked in return tube types. When, about 1905, the ship finally changed from kerosene lights to electric, a special engine for the dynamo had to be constructed to operate on the low pressure steam. The steam was also used in a peculiar system for repelling boarders with hot water direct from the boiler. Coal consumption before the latest modifications was two tons per hour and after the modifications was as low as one half ton per hour. The ship carried two steam launches. The ship had never made even ten knots until dispatched from the harbor at Cleveland to Buffalo to prevent riots on the assassination of President William McKinley 6 September 1901 and, with the safeties weighted, she made almost fourteen knots at 30 rpm at one point.

Early career
Michigan commissioned 29 September 1844 under the command of Commander William Inman and operated on the Great Lakes out of Erie, Pennsylvania, throughout her career. Strang was soon freed, but was assassinated by two of his followers on 19 June 1856. The assassins fled to Michigan for sanctuary and were taken to Mackinac and released.

In an encounter with Great Lakes "timber pirates" in the 1850s, a steamer rammed Michigan.  The pirate vessel was badly damaged in the maneuver, and was captured.

USS Michigan was the first iron-hulled ship in the US Navy.

American Civil War

During the American Civil War, Michigan was armed with a 30-pounder Parrott rifle, five 20-pounder Parrott rifles, six 24-pounder smoothbores, and two 12-pounder boat howitzers. The Confederate States of America considered launching attacks against the North from Canada. Early in 1863, Lieutenant William Henry Murdaugh, CSN, planned to lead a group of Confederate naval officers to Canada where they would purchase a small steamer, man her with Canadians and steam to Erie to board Michigan and use her against locks and shipping on the Great Lakes. However, Confederate President Jefferson Davis didn't approve the plan.

Michigan cruised on the Great Lakes during most of the war providing an element of stability and security. On 28 July 1863, a short time after New York City had been seriously shaken by riots, its Virginia-born Commander John C. Carter reported from Detroit, "I found the people suffering under serious apprehensions of a riot....The presence of the ships perhaps did something toward overawing the refractory, and certainly did much to allay the apprehensions of the excited, doubting people." During August 1863, Michigan was called on for similar service in Buffalo, New York.

During 1864, rumors of Confederate conspiracies in Canada were heard again. In March, Secretary of the Navy Gideon Welles ordered Michigan to be "prepared for active service as soon as the ice will permit." In the autumn, the Confederates finally struck. Led by Acting Master John Yates Beall, 20 Confederates embarked on the steamer  as passengers and soon seized her. They next captured and burned the steamer . Meanwhile, Captain Charles H. Cole, CSA, a Confederate agent in the Lake Erie region, was attempting to gain the trust of Michigans officers as the Michigan lay off Johnson's Island helping to guard Confederate prisoners. However, Commander Carter discovered Coles duplicity and had him arrested before Beall reached Johnson's Island on Philo Parsons. When the prearranged signals from shore were not made, Beall reluctantly abandoned his plan and retired to Sandwich (now Windsor, Ontario) where he stripped and burned Philo Parsons.

Later U.S. Navy service
After the Civil War, Michigan remained in U.S. Navy service, and was the ship which intercepted and interned the army of the Fenian Brotherhood as it returned from its invasion of Canada near Buffalo in 1866. On 16 July 1902 she was rammed at dock in Erie, Pennsylvania by Ore Carrier  moving at full steam which struck Michigan's bow a glancing blow then drove between Michigan and the dock carrying away the hawsers. Michigan was then shoved  down the harbor. The Michigan had her bowsprit, forecastle and forward bulkhead wrecked and she was scraped along the entire port side. The six pound Driggs-Schroeder rifles of the rear port battery were bent out of true and a boat on the port davits was demolished. The damage was between $10,000 and $15,000. The Michigan was renamed USS Wolverine on 17 June 1905 to free up the name Michigan for use by the new battleship .

Wolverine was decommissioned on 6 May 1912.

Pennsylvania Naval Militia service
Wolverine was turned over to the Pennsylvania Naval Militia, which she served for 11 years, making training cruises in the summer for the United States Naval Reserve. For the 1913 centennial of the War of 1812 Battle of Lake Erie, Wolverine towed the brig  from port to port as part of the celebrations. In mid-1920, when the U.S. Navy adopted its modern alphanumeric hull number system, she was classified as a "miscellaneous auxiliary" and designated IX-31. On 12 August 1923, a connecting rod of Wolverines port cylinder broke, ending her active career.

Relic
In 1927, Wolverines hulk was pushed up onto a sandbank in Misery Bay on the Presque Isle State Park Peninsula and loaned to the city of Erie, Pennsylvania, as a relic. She was sold to the Foundation for the Preservation of the Original USS Michigan, Inc., on 19 July 1948. But when fund-raising efforts failed to acquire sufficient money for her restoration and preservation, she was cut up and sold for scrap in 1949 to the Ace Junk & Salvage Company. Sam Tanenbaum, proprietor, donated the prow back to the city of Erie.

In 1950, Wolverines prow was erected as a monument in Wolverine Park in Erie, near the shipyard where she had been built. On 22 February 1998, the prow was moved to the Erie Maritime Museum for restoration.  Today it can be viewed inside the museum.

References

Bibliography

External links
history.navy.mil: USS Michigan
navsource.org: USS Michigan

Steamships of the United States Navy
Ships of the Union Navy
Church of Jesus Christ of Latter Day Saints (Strangite)
Michigan in the American Civil War
Great Lakes ships
Ships built in Pittsburgh
Fenian Raids
1843 ships
Miscellaneous auxiliaries of the United States Navy
Maritime incidents in May 1853